is a Japanese television jidaigeki or period drama that was broadcast in prime-time in 1972 to 1973. It is based on series of Nemuri Kyōshirō novels by Renzaburō Shibata. Masakazu Tamura played the role of Nemuri Kyōshirō. Tamura's older brother Takahiro Tamura and younger brother Ryo Tamura appeared as a guest in the episode 6. Five special editions of the drama were produced later also Tamura played the role on the stage in 1973 and 1981. The complete DVD box was released on April 10, 2019.  The original soundtrack was released on August 11, 2021.

Plot
Set in the eighteenth century, during the reign of the eleventh Tokugawa shōgun Tokugawa Ienari. Nemuri Kyōshirō is a master of the sword, but he is a man who shuts his mind and heart because of his unhappy background; Kyōshirō's father was a Dutch missionary and his mother was the daughter of Matsudaira Mondonoshoū, the Tokugawa shogunate's upper superintendent officer. He was an unwanted child and Kyōshirō's mother killed herself soon after Kyōshirō`s birth.) Although he hates being involved with incidents and people, he is always involved in them no matter where he goes. Some people challenge him to a duel to see his unusual Engetsu Sappō (Full Moon cut) sword style, while others try to use him because he is a half-breed. He solves incidents with both his intelligence and his Musō Masamune sword.

Cast
Masakazu Tamura as Nemuri Kyōshirō
Yoko Yamamoto as Mihoyo episode 1,2,22,26
Shingo Yamashiro as Kinpachi episode 1.21,25
Yumiko Nogawa as Mojiwaka episode 1,21
Shinsuke Ashida as Matsudaira Mondonoshō (Nemuri Kyōshirō `s grand father) episode 26
Renzaburō Shibata (appeared as an actor in episode 14,17,26)

Episode list

TV Specials

Nemuri Kyoshirō (1989) 
Kyoshirō becomes involved in a political power struggle when he uncovers a plot to subvert the Shogunate succession by replacing the Shogun's heir with a double.
Masakazu Tamura as Nemuri Kyōshirō
Yumi Takigawa
Shingo Yanagisawa as Kinpachi
Saburō Shinoda as Asu Shinken
Junkichi Orimoto
So Yamamura
Directed by Tokuzō Tanaka

Nemuri Kyōshirō: Conspiracy at Edo Castle (1993) 
Kyoshirō, who has returned to Edo after three years, protects Lady Mihoyo, who exactly resembles his late mother, as rival Elders struggle to destroy each other over the proposed marriage of the Shogun's heir.
 Masakazu Tamura as Nemuri Kyōshirō
 Keiko Takeshita
 Kimiko Ikegami
 Hirotarō Honda as Mibu Shushō
 Masahiko Tsugawa as Matsudaira Mondonoshou (Nemuri Kyōshirō's grand father)
Directed by Akira Inoue

Nemuri Kyoshirō: The Man with No Tomorrow (1996) 
Kyoshirō is asked to help save the Akita Clan from a plot which could end in the clan's extermination.
Masakazu Tamura as Nemuri Kyōshirō
Shin Takuma
Yoko Minamino
Shigeru Kōyama
Akira Nakao
Masahiko Tsugawa as Matsudaira Mondonoshou
Directed by Sadao Nakajima

Nemuri Kyoshirō: The Woman Who Loved Kyoshirō (1998) 
Kyoshirō's Full Moon Cut technique becomes the focus for both an artist who wants Kyoshirō to use that style to kill his wife and a lord who is obsessed with Kyoshirō. 
Masakazu Tamura as Nemuri Kyōshirō
Hitomi Kuroki as Orin
Hiroshi Abe as Sakaki Ryūnosuke
Kimiko Ikegami
Ken Nishida
Masahiko Tsugawa as Matsudaira Mondonoshou
Directed by Akira Inoue

Nemuri Kyoshirō: The Final (2018) 
Kyoshirō has returned to Edo after an absence of ten years, only to learn of the murder of his former teacher Priest Kunen. While Kyoshirō tries to hold himself aloof, one day a young girl named Misao suddenly appears to him claiming that he is her father. Kyoshirō doubts that Misao is really his daughter, but that is the least of the plots he must unravel, leading to a face-to-face confrontation with perhaps the most dangerous opponent he has ever faced ... a man who intends to utterly destroy the world Kyoshirō knows in order to create his ideal of Utopia and who also knows and can use the Full-Moon Cut sword style as well as Kyoshirō does!
Masakazu Tamura as Nemuri Kyōshirō
Riho Yoshioka as Misao
Masahiko Tsugawa as Matsudaira Mondonoshou
Norito Yashima as Kinpachi
Kippei Shiina as Kagami Yōzō
Masami Horiuchi as Mizuno Echizen-no-kami
Takeo Nakahara as Kunen
Ryuji Harada as a Ronin
Directed by Tomohiko Yamashita

On the Stage 
Nemuri Kyōshirō Buraihikae 1973
Nemuri Kyōshirō 1973
Nemuri Kyōshirō Curuz no Hahano Komoriuta 1981

References

External links
- Nemuri Kyōshirō at Toei Video

1972 Japanese television series debuts
1970s drama television series
Jidaigeki television series
Jidaigeki
1972 Japanese television series endings
1970s Japanese television series
Television shows based on Japanese novels